Clean Sweep is an upcoming Irish six-part thriller television series created by Gary Tieche. Distributed by ZDF Studios, it will premiere on RTÉ in Ireland and SundanceNow in the United States.

Cast
 Charlene McKenna as Shelly Mohan
 Barry Ward as Jason Mohan
 Rhys Mannion as Derek
 Trevor Kaneswaran as Matt Wilson
 Katelyn Rose Downey as Caitlin Mohan
 Aidan McCann as Niall Mohan
 Grace Collender as Doireann Carrick
 Yousef Quinn as Detective Baxter

Production
Clean Sweep was named as a projects that would receive public funding in November 2021. Created by Gary Tieche based on a true story, Shinawil was originally going to make the six-part thriller with Element 8 Entertainment before Incendo boarded the project instead. Francesca Harris was attached to write the series with Tieche, with Ronan Burke and Yves Christian Fournier directing. Executive producers included Tieche, Larry Bass, Mary Callery, Jin Ishimoto, Patty Lenahan Ishimoto, and Harvey Myman for Shinawil; Shannon Cooper for SundanceNow; and Graham Ludlow, Jean-Philippe Normandeau and Shari Segal for Incendo.

In July 2022, it was revealed Charlene McKenna would lead the series alongside Barry Ward.

Principal photography was originally scheduled to take place in 2021, but was postponed. McKenna was spotted filming by the Dargle River in early July 2022.

References

External links
 

2023 Irish television series debuts
RTÉ original programming
Sundance TV original programming
Television series based on actual events